Paramount Unified School District is a school district headquartered in Paramount, California, United States.

The district serves the city of Paramount, and portions of Lakewood,  Bellflower, Long Beach, Compton, Rancho Dominguez, and South Gate with eleven elementary schools, five middle schools, one comprehensive high school (Paramount High School), and a number of other educational facilities.

Schools
High schools:
 Paramount High School (two campuses in Paramount, one for freshmen and one for upperclassmen )
 Buena Vista High School (Lakewood)
K-8 schools:
 Hollydale School (South Gate)
Middle schools:
 Alondra Middle School (Paramount)
 Jackson 4-8 Middle School (Paramount)
 Paramount Park Middle School (Paramount)
 Zamboni Middle School (Paramount)
Elementary schools:
 Collins Elementary School (Long Beach)
 Gaines Elementary School (Paramount)
 Jefferson Elementary School (Paramount)
 Keppel Elementary School (Paramount)
 Lincoln Elementary School (Paramount)
 Los Cerritos Elementary School (Paramount)
 Mokler Elementary School (Paramount)
 Roosevelt Elementary School (Paramount)
 Tanner Elementary School (Paramount)
 Wirtz Elementary School (Paramount)

External links

 Paramount USD

School districts in Los Angeles County, California
Paramount, California 
Lakewood, California
Bellflower, California 
Compton, California
Long Beach, California
South Gate, California